Murad was a brand of cigarettes.

History

Turkish tobacco is sun-cured, which makes it more aromatic and, like flue-cured tobacco, more acidic than air or smoke-cured tobacco, thus more suitable for cigarette production.

In the early 1900s, manufactures of Turkish cigarettes tripled their sales and became legitimate competitors to leading brands. 

The New York-based Greek tobacconist Soterios Anargyros produced the hand-rolled Murad  cigarettes, made of pure Turkish tobacco.

Lorillard acquired the Murad brand in 1911 through the dissolution of the Cigarette Trust, explaining the high quality of the Murad advertisements in the following years.

Marketing
Murad referenced the Oriental roots of their Turkish tobacco blends through pack art and advertising images. Surely one of the most gorgeously over-the-top ad campaigns for any cigarette was the long-running series for Murad brand made by Rea Irvin.

Collectible cards

Murad Cigarettes issued a series of cigarette cards featuring the university colors, pennants, and seals of various universities and colleges around 1910. Some cards also featured a vignette of a scene, some sporting like baseball, football, or golf, but others with just general scenes. Tobacco cards were often included in packs of cigarettes until the mid-twentieth century and served to stiffen the cigarette packages, advertise, and encourage product loyalty with the collectible cards.

Decline 
Nevertheless, due to the rise of American cigarettes, cigarettes containing only Turkish tobacco, like Murad, Fatima, Helmar, Balkan Sobranie or those supplied by urban tobacconists like Fribourg & Treyer or Sullivan Powell in London, are no longer available.
Indeed, tastes in Europe and the United States shifted away from Turkish tobacco and towards Virginia tobacco, during and after the First World War.

See also
Egyptian cigarette industry
Turkish tobacco

Notes

Smoking
Cigarette brands